Cary is a station on Metra's Union Pacific Northwest Line in Cary, Illinois. The station is located at 100 W. Main St. near Northwest Highway (US 14). The station consists of two side platforms which serve two tracks. A station house where tickets may be purchased is on the inbound platform. The station house was on the outbound side until 2021, when it was demolished in favor of the new building. Parking is available.

As of April 25, 2022, Cary is served by 53 trains (26 inbound, 27 outbound) on weekdays, by 30 trains (15 in each direction) on Saturdays, and by 20 trains (nine inbound, all 11 outbound) on Sundays.

References

External links
Metra - Cary Station
Station from Main Street from Google Maps Street View

Metra stations in Illinois
Former Chicago and North Western Railway stations
Railway stations in the United States opened in 1952
Railway stations in McHenry County, Illinois